Selo pri Žirovnici is one of ten villages in the Municipality of Žirovnica in the Upper Carniola region of Slovenia. It lies on the slopes of the Reber range between Žirovnica and Zabreznica and is more or less a continuous settlement with Zabreznica. There are open fields south of the village.

Name
The name of the settlement was changed from Selo to Selo pri Žirovnici in 1953.

Church
The church of St. Cantius was first mentioned in 1468 and is a Baroque structure with a belfry from 1764, but there is evidence that it replaced an earlier Romanesque structure. Fragments of 15th-century frescoes survive on the southern wall. The interior of the church was renovated in 1955.

Mass grave

Selo pri Žirovnici is the site of a mass grave from the period immediately after the Second World War. The Selo pri Žirovnici Mass Grave, also known as the Pohar Meadow Mass Grave, is located in a meadow next to a fence separating it from a pasture, northeast of the house at Selo pri Žirovnici no. 114. The grave site is marked by raised earth. It contains the remains of six Croatian soldiers murdered between 14 and 18 May 1945.

References

External links

Selo pri Žirovnici at Geopedia

Populated places in the Municipality of Žirovnica